The Ministry of Higher Education is a department of the Namibian government. It was established in 1995 under the name Ministry of Higher Education and Vocational Education as a split-off from the Ministry of Education (MOE) and existed in this form until 2005 when its portfolio fell back to the MOE. In 2015 it was reestablished as Ministry of Higher Education, Training and Innovation (MHETI).

The first Namibian higher education minister was Nahas Angula, the  minister is Itah Kandji-Murangi.

Ministers
All higher education ministers in chronological order are:

References

External links
Official website Ministry of Higher Education, Training and Innovation

Higher education
Higher education
Education in Namibia
1995 establishments in Namibia
2005 disestablishments in Namibia
2015 establishments in Namibia